'Battleship' (also known as 'Battleship: The Classic Naval Warfare Game') is a PC video game developed by NMS Software Ltd. and published by Hasbro Interactive, released in 1996 in Germany, and 1997 and 1999 in North America and the United Kingdom.

Gameplay

Battleship is a revision of the board game popularised by the Milton Bradley Company. The game contains several variants: 'Classic', which generally follows the turn-based rules of the board game, and the more in-depth 'Ultimate Battleship', where players manipulate fleets of ships on a larger playing field in real-time. 'Ultimate Battleship' is supported by several game modes, including missions and scenarios.Battleship also features local 'hot seat' play, and supports multiplayer games for up to four players over LAN, modem-to-modem, or online using MPlayer.

Reception

Battleship received a lukewarm reception. Positive reviews evaluated the game based upon its innovations compared to the board game. Mark Clarkson of Computer Gaming World stated the real-time approach of the game was a "pleasant surprise", and "Hasbro has spruced up the old game considerably". Gareth Jones of PC PowerPlay praised the game as "more technical than the board game" with its "deep and complex gameplay, although acknowledged that "apart from the name, it's actually almost nothing like the original board game". 

Less favorable reviews of Battleship focused on the lack of depth of certain features. Andy Mitchell of PC Zone stated the game's "bells and whistles...ultimately doesn't change the fact that this is still a pretty basic concept wrapped in hi-tech clothing". Moira Muldoon of GameSpot critiqued the Classic mode of the game as having "no strategy", due to players being unable to turn boats lengthwise, and knowing which type of ship they have hit.

References

External links

1996 video games
Multiplayer hotseat games
Naval video games
NMS Software games
Top-down video games
Turn-based strategy video games
Video games based on board games
Windows games
Windows-only games